Luyolo Nomandela (born 3 November 1989) is a South African professional soccer player who plays as a midfielder for Chippa United FC.

Club career
Mayano, as he is popularly known, made his PSL debut at the beginning of the 2012/2013 season for Free State Stars F.C. from the club's feeder development side Carara Kicks F.C. 
Luyolo went on to become the club's prominent figure for the next few seasons due to his ball controlling ability, vision and pace, winning the club's rookie of the season award and helping the team to a top 8 finish.

At the start of the 2013/2014 season he was strongly linked with Kaizer Chiefs F.C. but the move never materialized. At the end of that season Nomandela joined Mamelodi Sundowns F.C. on a four-year deal. He made just a few off the appearances for the club under coach Pitso Mosimane, being mostly in the side's development squad in the Multichoice Diski Challenge

While still contracted to Mamelodi Sundowns F.C. he had loan spells with Moroka Swallows F.C. and Jomo Cosmos F.C. with both clubs suffering relegations one year apart, while Nomandela played for the clubs.

In October 2016 Nomandela and Mamelodi Sundowns F.C. reached an agreement to part ways with the player surfacing at Cape Town City F.C. shortly after announcement. His stint in the mother city was also a less successful one having made very few appearances off the bench under Eric Tinkler.

Before the end of the 2016/2017 PSL campaign, in April 2016 Cape Town City F.C. announced that they had parted ways with the player for undisclosed reasons.

At the beginning of the 2017/2018 NFD campaign, Nomandela was unveiled by Mthatha Bucks F.C. as part of their plan to try to return to the PSL after more than a decade of absence. It was soon reported that the player had been suspended by the club for disciplinary reasons leaving many of his supporters and admirers blaming it all on the big-money move he made to Mamelodi Sundowns F.C. in the winter transfer window of 2014 which, in the opinion of many, was the beginning of the end of his career.

On 16 January 2019, Nomandela joined Baberwa FC.

International career
He made his first national team appearance under Gordon Igesund in the summer of 2013 scoring on debut against Burkina Faso.

References

Jomo Cosmos sign Luyolo Nomandela, kickoff.com, 6 January 2016

External links
 

1989 births
Living people
South African soccer players
Association football midfielders
Free State Stars F.C. players
F.C. Buffalo (South Africa) players
Carara Kicks F.C. players
Mamelodi Sundowns F.C. players
Moroka Swallows F.C. players
Jomo Cosmos F.C. players
Cape Town City F.C. (2016) players
Mthatha Bucks F.C. players